Pattypan squash (or 'patty pan') is a varietal group of summer squash (Cucurbita pepo) notable for its round and shallow shape, and scalloped edges, somewhat resembling a flying saucer.  The name "pattypan" derives from "a pan for baking a patty". Its French name, pâtisson, derives from a Provençal word for a cake made in a scalloped mould. The pattypan squash is also known as UFO squash, scallop squash,  granny squash, custard squash, ciblème in Cajun French, button squash, scallopini, or simply "squash" in Australian English, or schwoughksie squash (pronounced "shwooxie squash"), especially if grown in the Poughkeepsie, New York, area.

Pattypan squash comes in white, yellow, orange, light green, dark green, and multicolored varieties. The squash is most tender when immature. In fine cuisine, its tender flesh is sometimes scooped out and mixed with flavorings, such as garlic, prior to reinsertion; the scooped-out husk of a pattypan is also sometimes used as a decorative container for other foods. Pattypan is a good source of magnesium, niacin, and vitamins A and C. One cup contains approximately 20 to 30 calories and no fat. It is often sliced, baked, or coated and fried until golden brown, or simply boiled. In Polish and Ukrainian cuisine, they are pickled in sweet vinegar.

References

Squashes and pumpkins